C21 is the debut album from the Danish boy band C21, released on 22 May 2003.

Track listing

External links 
C21 at Discogs

C21 (band) albums
2003 debut albums